Darkened Room is an 8-minute film directed by David Lynch. It first appeared on Lynch's website, DavidLynch.com, in 2002. It has subsequently been released on the DVD anthology Dynamic:01.

In the first half of the film, a Japanese woman shows us her apartment in Tokyo and muses on the amount of bananas produced worldwide. The woman then tells us that her friend next door is sad. In the second half, a blonde woman (Jordan Ladd) sits on a sofa and cries. Then a brunette woman (Cerina Vincent) enters and says cruel things to her, before threatening to tell her the truth. The film ends with a fade to black.

The film was shot on digital video. In an introduction that appears on the Dynamic:01 DVD, Lynch calls the film "an experiment based on some idea", and says the film "was always some kind of tie in to bananas, information concerning bananas, so we can all learn some things as we enjoy the shows". Then he laughs.

Cast
 Jordan Ladd as Girl #1
 Etsuko Shikata as Herself
 Cerina Vincent as Girl #2

External links
Davidlynch.com 

2002 films
Short films directed by David Lynch
American independent films
American short films
2000s English-language films
2002 short films
Films with screenplays by David Lynch
2002 independent films
2000s American films